Mikhail Aleksandrovich Nikitin (born 26 November 1971) is a Russian former professional footballer.

He made his professional debut in the Soviet Second League in 1991 for FC Sokol Saratov.

References

1971 births
People from Saratov Oblast
Living people
Soviet footballers
Russian footballers
Russian Premier League players
FC Shinnik Yaroslavl players
FC Lada-Tolyatti players
FC Baltika Kaliningrad players
FC Sokol Saratov players
Association football forwards
Sportspeople from Saratov Oblast